Tana Talk 4 is the third studio album by American rapper Benny the Butcher. It was released on March 11, 2022 through Griselda Records and Black Soprano Family and distributed by Empire Distribution. It is the fourth installment in his Tana Talk series, following up the 2018 album Tana Talk 3. The album was produced by The Alchemist, Daringer and Beat Butcha. It features guest appearances by labelmates Conway the Machine and Westside Gunn and other appearances by J. Cole, Diddy, Stove God Cooks, Boldy James, and 38 Spesh.

Background
The name of the album is a reference to Montana Avenue in Buffalo, New York.
The cover is a painting of his deceased older brother, Machine Gun Black, Benny, and Westside Gunn.

Singles
On January 28, 2022, Benny the Butcher released the lead single "Johnny P's Caddy" featuring J. Cole. On March 11, 2022, he released the album’s second single "Ten More Commandments" which features Diddy and which is inspired by "Ten Crack Commandments" by The Notorious B.I.G. released in 1997.

Track listing

Credits adapted from Spotify.

References

2018 debut albums
East Coast hip hop albums
Griselda Records albums
Albums produced by the Alchemist (musician)
Albums produced by Daringer (producer)
Albums produced by Beat Butcha